The India men's national tennis team represents India in Davis Cup tennis competition and are governed by the All India Tennis Association.

History
India competed in its first Davis Cup in 1921 but has yet to win the Cup.

India finished as runners-up 3 times (1966, 1974, 1987), the most by any nation from Asia proper. In 1974, the final was scratched and South Africa were awarded the Davis Cup after India refused to participate in the final due to the South African government's apartheid policies. India were strong favorites to win with Vijay Amritraj and Anand Amritraj at their best.

Current team 

Win–loss as of 12 March 2022, rankings as of 12 March 2022.
Non-playing captain
 Rohit Rajpal

Notable former members
 Anand Amritraj
 Prakash Amritraj
 Akhtar Ali 
 Vijay Amritraj
 Mahesh Bhupathi
 Somdev Devvarman
 Hassan Ali Fyzee
 Nitin Kirtane
 Sandeep Kirtane
 Ramanathan Krishnan
 Ramesh Krishnan
 Naresh Kumar
 Premjit Lall
 Harsh Mankad
 Sashi Menon
 Shiv Prakash Misra
 Jaidip Mukerjea
 Susheel Narla
 Leander Paes
 Nunna Rama Rao
 Jasjit Singh

Results

Some best results

2000s

2010s

2020s

Notes

Footnotes

References

External links

Davis Cup teams
Davis Cup
Davis Cup